Dulce María, a Mexican singer, songwriter, actress and author, has released four studio albums, one EP and 23 singles, 14 music videos and two lyric videos.

Albums

Studio albums

EP

Singles

As lead artist

As featured artist

Other songs

As lead artist

As featured artist

Music videos

As lead artist

As featured artist

As an actress

Lyric videos

As lead artist

As featured artist

Notes

References

Discographies of Mexican artists
Electronic music discographies
Pop music discographies
Latin music discographies